Naqqash (also Romanized as Naqqāsh and Naghghash) is a village in Kharaqan-e Gharbi Rural District, Central District, Avaj County, Qazvin Province, Iran. At the 2006 census, its population was 6, in 4 families.

References 

Populated places in Avaj County